"Massive Attack" is the commercial debut single by Trinidadian-American rapper and singer Nicki Minaj, featuring Sean Garrett and was released on April 13, 2010. The song was produced by Garrett and Alex da Kid, who wrote the song together with Minaj. It was initially intended to be the lead single from Minaj's debut studio album, Pink Friday, but the song was dropped from the album due to the single's underwhelming commercial performance. The song was a distinct change in Minaj's previous work on mixtapes and features and received mixed reviews from critics, commending lyrical content and distinctiveness, and criticizing that it did not fit her "Barbie" persona well. An accompanying music video which features a helicopter chase, and militaristic jungle and desert scenes, was positively received.

Commercially, the song had limited success, reaching number 65 on the US Hot R&B/Hip-Hop Songs, while failing to chart on the Billboard Hot 100. Later in an interview with Billboard magazine, Garrett revealed that the song would not be included on Pink Friday and that the poor performance of the song was out of his control, "I was only able to do as much as I was allowed to do. Sometimes you have to step back and get off the wheel. I didn't have control of the entire creative process. A lot of [other] artists trust me enough and allow me to do what I know is best to do as a producer". The song is included in the dance video game, "Dance Central 2" which was released on October 11, 2011.

Background
In an interview with Rap-Up in March 2010, Minaj revealed the title to the song, and Garrett later hinted around details around his single with Minaj, stating, "I just did Nicki’s first single featuring me. It’s gonna be a fucking bomb. It’s very, very explosive! It’s a club banger. It’s a lot broader than what people would expect her to come with. The record puts her in the game in a way that says she should’ve been here a long time ago. She has a real way of how she wants to do this. It’s just gonna be a surprise when it comes. She just wants to make it as huge as possible." Additionally, co-producer Alex da Kid said, "I started on the train and finished in the studio. I knew it was special from the start. It wasn't like I was aiming for Nicki with this track; I had an idea I thought was crazy. Nicki heard it and the rest was history." In an interview with MTV News, Minaj stated when she first heard the song she felt she was in Africa and fell in love with the drum beats, and commented, "It's a very rare. ... You're not gonna get the song the first time you hear it. After the second or third time, you're gonna be like, 'Whoa, what is this?' It sounds nothing like anything that's out right now." She also called the song "next-level futuristic", and said that she chose Garrett for the song in that he would be the best to "illustrate Nicki Minaj", as he got her and her personality". In an interview on the set of the video shoot for "Massive Attack", Minaj said, "I'm excited for people to hear me ... doing more than one verse. It's really creative. I wanted to be theatrical, but I am very serious about what I do." Also on the set of the video, Garrett said, "We wanted to give her something that was global," he continued. "We wanted to give her something that was urban; we wanted to give her something that was mainstream pop, you know what I mean, that the world could get a chance to see her out on this pedestal. And of course, you know, I had to come along with her, because I've got an album dropping soon." The song made its debut March 29, 2010 on WQHT. The song leaked onto the Internet on March 30, 2010, the day before its music video premiere on 106 & Park. The single's art cover was revealed on April 1, 2010, featuring a still of Minaj in the music video as a ninja and comic book font designs. Alex da Kid said that a lot of artists wanted the beat such as Jamie Foxx and Young Jeezy but he gave it to Nicki because it fit her "quirky, left-field vibe."

Alex da Kid was also interviewed by Rap-Up, and when asked about the commercial flop of the song and he said, "My whole thing [is that] I don’t want to do anything that’s the same as what’s out there, I think 'Massive Attack' may have been too different. If we would've put a big feature on it, like a Kanye or Rihanna or someone, I think it might've done a bit better. It needed something familiar about it."

Music and lyrics

The song fuses hip-hop and dance as Minaj delivers her lyrics in a Caribbean accent. It is composed in a "futuristic" style with heavy drum beats. It carries a "chaotic" beat with "screechy Euro-club synths" compared to Timbaland. Minaj references E.T. The Extra Terrestrial, Mr. Miyagi, The Phantom of the Opera, and Simba and Mufasa of The Lion King film in her lines.

Critical reception
Monica Herrera of Billboard gave the single a mixed review, stating that Minaj, being "one of the most visually distinctive rappers to come along in years", that the single was an "anticlimactic coming out song", "considering the hype Minaj has generated through mixtapes, cameos and her co-starring role in Lil Wayne's Young Money project". However Hererra did commend the lyrical content, stating "her sassy one-liners are as entertaining as always", and the overall production although it didn't suit Minaj's "her mental-patient delivery nearly as well as, say, Kane Beatz' simpler track for Young Money's "BedRock". Robbie Daw of 'Idolator' said, "we wouldn’t expect Nicki to do any less than come out of the gate charging full force, lyrically, on her debut single. That said, we were expecting maybe a tad more of a melody on the track." Chris Ryan of 'MTV Buzzworthy' gave the song a positive review, stating "you get the feeling, listening to the song's air-raid keyboards and thunderous beats, that the Young Money princess really wants to separate herself from the rap pack and carve out a space all her own". Ryan also said, "her verbal dexterity, complex flow and humor, Nicki is reminiscent of classic Missy Elliott – and that's a compliment of the highest order".

Music video
A music video for the single was shot on March 15, 2010 in the deserts of Lancaster, California, directed by Hype Williams. When talking to MTV News about the video Minaj stated, "I didn't want to shoot the typical new-artist vision. Thank God I have a wonderful label that stands behind me and my vision. I met Hype in a freakin' airport...and it happened to be a week before I wanted to shoot a video. I told him the idea. Of course, I had to let Baby and Slim know and hope they would understand my expensive taste. It all came together." It's just beautiful — the clothes, everything. The ambiance..It's for all the girls that like to play dress-up. They're gonna love this one...we get on the walkie-talkie, like, 'Mayday! Mayday!' It's really fashion and beauty shots, and we're acting like we're doing something important. We wanted to make it pretty in the dirt. We wanted to have a very crazy contrast. I didn't want to do everything clean. I like the dirt. All that pink stuff looks even prettier in the dirt."

Concept 
Sean Garrett appears in the video and Birdman, Amber Rose, and Ringmasters of Season 3 of America's Best Dance Crew make cameos. The video premiered on BET's 106 & Park on March 31, 2010 The video is in native 4:3 instead of 16:9 like most other music videos from the era. The video comprises a helicopter chase and militaristic desert and jungle scenes. The music video begins with Birdman giving Minaj a stack of money to carry to an unknown area in the desert. As the song begins Minaj appears in a blonde wig with a pink background which then cuts to Minaj riding in a pink Lamborghini with Amber Rose driving as a potential new take on Thelma & Louise in a helicopter chase. Shots of desert creatures and Minaj in her Barbie wig are shown during the first hook. As the helicopter chase progresses, Minaj is seen singing to the camera in military gear and is later shown walking in an attacking line with her Harajuku Army, which are all dressed in the same gear with pink wigs under helmets. During the chorus of the song, a shirtless Garrett is shown singing into the camera while clips of the helicopter chase are interpreted. During the second verse Minaj is in the jungle as a ninja with a long pink braid running down her back as she crawls on the ground and walks around the jungle. Some clips of two men (from Ringmasters) dancing with double-jointed shoulders are also shown. During the climax of the song Minaj is still in the jungle this time with a green wig, dancing in the mud and comes out of the water, crawling through the forest. The video ends as clips of the entire video are shown and closes with Minaj and Rose escaping in the pink Lamborghini.

Reception and lawsuit 
The video garnered media attention, with Monica Herrera of Billboard commenting on a review for the single, "It figures, then, that discussion of her debut single, "Massive Attack," would take a back seat to its Hype Williams-directed, B-movie-inspired video." Chris Ryan of MTV News commented on the video, saying, "We L-U-V Barbie because she's a trendsetter and a strident, unique artist. But with great style comes great responsibility. Her video for 'Massive Attack,' the first single off her long-awaited debut album, is bananas".

On June 11, 2010 Hollywood Exotic Car Rental filed a lawsuit against Minaj for damages and unpaid rental charges on the car. They claimed that the vehicle was driven "off-road" and damaged “in the approximate amount of $11,589.41." Along with damages to the car, Minaj rented the car for $1,750 a day, and used the vehicle an additional three days totaling in an extra $5,250 owed. The rental company is suing for unpaid rental charges, property damage, and punitive damage.

Charts

Release history

References

2010 debut singles
Music videos directed by Hype Williams
Nicki Minaj songs
Songs written by Nicki Minaj
Songs written by Sean Garrett
Song recordings produced by Alex da Kid
Songs written by Alex da Kid
2010 songs
2010 singles